Rupgarh is a village in the Bhiwani district of the Indian state of Haryana. , the village had 486 households with a population of 2,599 of which 1,333 were male and 1,266 female.

References

Villages in Bhiwani district